George Marton may refer to:

 George Marton (1801–1867), British Conservative Party Member of Parliament (MP) for Lancaster 1837–1847
 George Marton (1839–1905), his son, Conservative MP for Lancaster 1885–1886